"Nena" (Spanish for "Baby") is a song released as a single in 1986.  It was written by Miguel Bosé, E. Aldrighetti, and V. Ierovante, and was included on Bose's studio album Salamandra.

Miguel Bosé and Paulina Rubio version 
The same song was re-recorded, including Mexican singer Paulina Rubio and was released as the first single from Bosé's album Papito. This new version was produced by Carlos Jean.

On August 29, 2007 this new version received a Latin Grammy nomination for Record of the Year.

Charts

Solo

with Paulina Rubio

Certifications

References 

Miguel Bosé songs
2007 singles
1986 singles
Paulina Rubio songs
Male–female vocal duets
Spanish songs
1986 songs
Songs written by Miguel Bosé